Haselton Icefall is an icefall descending from the Willett Range between Gibson Spur and the Apocalypse Peaks toward Webb Lake in Barwick Valley, Victoria Land, Antarctica. It was named by Parker E. Calkin for fellow United States Antarctic Research Program geologist George M. Haselton, who assisted Calkin in the field in this area in the 1961–62 season.

References

Icefalls of Antarctica
Landforms of Victoria Land
Scott Coast
Willett Range